NRL Western Australia (abbreviated as NRLWA, and formerly the Western Australian Rugby League) is responsible for administering the game of rugby league football in the state of Western Australia.

The NRLWA administers all forms of the game in Western Australia and runs the main Perth metropolitan competitions. This includes eleven clubs in the Perth metropolitan competition (seven fielding first grade), sponsored as the Fuel to Go and Play Premiership, as well as representative teams that compete in interstate competitions. There are over 4,000 participants

History
Formed in April 1948 as the Western Australian Amateur Rugby Football League, foundation clubs were Cottesloe, Fremantle, Perth and South Perth.

The first interstate match played by Western Australians was against the South Australia in 1948, with WA winning the series 2–0.

In 1969 Darwin City invited the WARL to Darwin to play a match in celebration of Darwin's 100th founding anniversary in which WA won 23–19. In 1976 WA was invited to participate in the nationwide Amco Cup, where they defeated the Northern Territory 23–18.

On 2 October 1982 to begin the 1982 Kangaroo tour of Great Britain and France, Western Australia played the Wally Lewis captained Australian Kangaroos in a match at the Cannington Raceway in Perth (on the same day the Australian test team played their first ever test match against Papua New Guinea in Port Moresby). Predictably the Kangaroos defeated WA 57–5, running in 13 tries to 1 with Parramatta Eels winger Eric Grothe, Sr. crossing for 4 tries. The Australian team that day included players who would go on to be mainstays in the Australian test team over the next 5–10 years including Lewis, Grothe, Gene Miles, Steve Mortimer, Greg Conescu and Wayne Pearce as well as test veterans Rod Morris and Les Boyd.

NT toured again in 1981, 1983 & 1985 and since 2001 Western Australia has competed annually in the Affiliated States Championship, winning the most titles of any state.

International touring teams in WA
International football also has a history in WA, with Great Britain Lions touring Perth in 1950, 1957 1962 1975 England 1958, and France touring in 1951, 1955, 1964, 1990.

Club Football

The first tour game by an interstate club was in 1949 when Balmain Tigers, NSWRL, traveled to Perth. The first tour match by a club affiliated with the Queensland Rugby League was in 1985 when the Qld Country side played a match against the WA State Team. Further interstate club matches occurred in (see list above)

Following the demise of the Western Reds professional rugby league was lost to WA. The next match occurred in 1999 when the Western Suburbs Magpies hosted the Melbourne Storm in an NRL premiership match. Further premiership matches followed in 2005 when Cronulla Sharks hosted the New Zealand Warriors, and in July 2013 when the South Sydney Rabbitohs hosted the New Zealand Warriors at NIB Stadium

Trial matches have also been played, with South Sydney Rabbitohs hosting Canterbury Bulldogs in the 2005 pre-season.

National competition

The staging of New South Wales Rugby League premiership matches in the late 1980s and early 1990s led to a push for a Perth-based entry into the Australian Rugby League competition. In 1992 the Western Reds club was accepted into the national competition and would play its first season in 1995. The Reds would play in 1996 and in the Australian Super League in 1997 under the Perth Reds moniker.

Debt, issues surrounding the Super League war and formation of the National Rugby League led to the club being wound-up at the end of the 1997 season.

On 12 December 2006 the Australian Rugby League board accepted a proposal to establish a Western Australian Rugby League representative side to play in the NSWRL Jim Beam Cup for seasons 2008 & 2009, known as the WA Reds and played home matches at Perth Oval. In season 2010 the decision was made to enter the WA Reds team into the SG Ball Cup Under 18 competition. The season was a tough one with the 'Reds' finishing next to bottom of the ladder winning only their opening game of the season. The 2011 season saw the young Reds side improve their credentials finishing 13/18 with 3 wins from 9 matches for the season.

On 27 June 2012 the Western Australian Rugby League announced a new identity for its NRL entry bid. 
The West Coast Pirates has been released as the team name, with the logo a Pirate Skull over Crossed Cutlasses.

The announcement of this new bid identity is viewed as a longer-term strategy for a Western Australian-based National Rugby League but as yet seems further from implementation than 
when first conceived many due to the NRL officially stating that will be no further expansion until 2017 to shore up its financially weak structure.

WARL competitions

Pilbara Rugby League
The Pilbara Rugby League is a six club competition in the north-west of Western Australia. 
The clubs are:
 Karratha Broncos
 Karratha Roosters
 Karratha Storm
 Port Hedland Hawks
 South Hedland Cougars
 Wickham Wasps

WARL 

The NRLWA, sponsored as the Fuel to Go and Play Premiership, is the premier rugby league football competition in the state. The majority of the Eleven clubs originate in the Perth metro area and both Fremantle and South Perth are foundation WARL clubs. Junior grades run from under 6's up to under 16's and senior competition is divided into four divisions, Men's First Grade, Men's Reserve Grade (Val Murphy Trophy), Women's Tackle and Women's League Tag (Flag Belt).

* Denotes currently fielding a First Grade Team in the Fuel to Go and Play Premiership

First Grade Premiers

* Denotes club dissolved and no longer exists

Notable WARL juniors competed in the NRL

Fremantle Roosters
Russell Addison (1960-61 South Sydney Rabbitohs)
Brian Wedgewood (1967-70 Canterbury Bulldogs)

South Perth Lions
Jon Grieve (1991-97 Manly Warringah Sea Eagles & Western Reds)
Jon Green (2006-13 Canterbury Bulldogs, St George Illawarra & Cronulla Sharks)
Bryson Goodwin (2007-20 Cronulla Sharks, Canterbury Bulldogs & South Sydney Rabbitohs) l
Bronx Goodwin (2007-12 Canberra Raiders, Cronulla Sharks & St George Illawarra)
Cory Paterson (2007-14 Newcastle Knights, North Queensland Cowboys & Wests Tigers)
Kennedy Cherrington (2020- Sydney Roosters)
Kurt De Luis (2021- Manly Sea Eagles)

Canning Bulldogs
Luke Goodwin (1992-99 Canterbury Bulldogs, Penrith Panthers, Western Reds & Western Suburbs Magpies)

North Beach Sea Eagles
Jarrad Millar (1997 Western Reds)
Daniel Holdsworth (2004-14 Cronulla Sharks, St George Illawarra & Canterbury Bulldogs)

Belmont Steelers
Matt Petersen (2002-08 Parramatta Eels, North Queensland Cowboys & Gold Coast Titans)

Joondalup Giants
Lee Te Maari (2006-10 St George Illawarra, Canterbury Bulldogs & Parramatta Eels)
Curtis Rona (2014–18 North Queensland Cowboys, Canterbury Bulldogs) 
Waqa Blake (2015- Penrith Panthers, Parramatta Eels)
Anneka Taia-Stephens (2018- St George-Illawarra Dragons)

Willagee Bears
Chance Peni (2013-16 Newcastle Knights, Wests Tigers)
Royce Hunt (2016- Canberra Raiders, Cronulla)
Jordan Pererira (2018- St George Illawarra Dragons)
Shanice Parker (2019- Sydney Roosters)

Ellenbrook Rabbitohs
Jackson Topine (2020- Canterbury Bulldogs)

South Headland Cougars
Ilaisaane Finau (2015 Australian Jillaroos)

See also

Rugby league in Western Australia

References

External links
 
 

Rugby league governing bodies in Australia
Rugby league in Western Australia
Ru
1948 establishments in Australia
Sports organizations established in 1948